Holley R. Cantine, Jr., (1916–1977) was a writer and activist best known for publishing the anarchist periodical Retort with Dachine Rainer.

Life 

Cantine was born on February 14, 1916, and raised in Woodstock, New York. His father owned a paper-coating business in Saugerties and his mother was a painter.

Cantine edited the first issue of Retort with Dorothy Paul in June 1942. By the 1947, Cantine was editing alongside the anarchist poet Dachine Rainer and Retort has become "An Anarchist Quarterly". The pair were jailed during World War II as conscientious objectors. They subsequently edited and published a collection of writings from conscientious objectors, Prison Etiquette, in 1950. Retort ceased publication in 1951.

He also wrote a weekly periodical, The Wasp, which took antagonistic aim at Woodstock tourists ("trudgers") and the town's commercialization. His 1959 science fiction short story, "Double Double Toil and Trouble", received several awards. Cantine also translated Volin's The Unknown Revolution from French and his own Second Chance: A Story.

Cantine died on January 2, 1977, in a house fire in Woodstock.

References

Bibliography

Further reading 

 
 
 
 
 

1916 births
1977 deaths
American anarchists
20th-century American male writers
Deaths from fire in the United States
People from Woodstock, New York
Translators from French
American conscientious objectors
20th-century translators